CMW may refer to:

Central Maintenance and Welding, the leading union contractor in FL
 Canadian Music Week, an industry conference and music festival held in Toronto, Canada
 Chicago, Missouri and Western Railway (CM&W), a railway which operated in the midwest United States
 Chien-Ming Wang, baseball pitcher
 Compton's Most Wanted, an American gangsta rap group
 Canadian Manufacturing Week (CMW), a trade show sponsored by the Society of Manufacturing Engineers
 Ignacio Agramonte International Airport, IATA airport code CMW